Vladimir Gaidamașciuc (born 11 June 1971) is a retired footballer from Moldova who played as a midfielder for various clubs in Moldova, Ukraine and Russia. He made 45 appearances for the Moldova national team, scoring once.

Club career
Gaidamașciuc began his playing career at Olimpia Bălţi, where in 1988 he was promoted to the first team squad, playing in the Second League in the Soviet Union. In 1991, he joined Odesa in Ukraine, followed by a short time with Nyva Vinnytsia before moving in 1992 to a third Ukrainian club, Bukovyna Chernivtsi, where he played for a year.

In 1994, Gaidamașciuc returned to Moldova with Tiligul-Tiras Tiraspol, where in 1995, he helped win the Moldovan Cup. He remained with Tiligul until the end of 1997 and in early 1998 moved to Hînceşti. After a year, he moved again, to join Sheriff Tiraspol. In 1999, he again won the national cup, and the following year, the club finished as runners-up in the Moldovan National Division.

In the summer of 2000, he joined Agro Chişinău, before moving to Russia in 2002 to join Lukoil Chelyabinsk for a season, before transferring to Zenit Chelyabinsk the following year, where he remained until he retired in 2006.

International career
He made his international debut on 20 May 1992, in a 1–1 draw in a friendly match against Lithuania. In his career, he played in the qualifiers for Euro 96, the 1998 World Cup, Euro 2000 and the 2002 World Cup. Between 1992 and 2001, he played for the national team 45 times and scored one goal.

International goal
Scores and results list Moldova's goal tally first.

Honours

Club
Tiligul-Tiras Tiraspol
Moldovan Cup: 1995

Sheriff Tiraspol
Moldovan Cup: 1999
Moldovan National Division runners-up: 1999–2000

References

External links
 

1971 births
Living people
People from Bălți
Moldovan footballers
Moldova international footballers
Association football midfielders
CSF Bălți players
SKA Odesa players
CS Tiligul-Tiras Tiraspol players
FC Nyva Vinnytsia players
FC Bukovyna Chernivtsi players
FC Sheriff Tiraspol players
Ukrainian Premier League players
Moldovan expatriate footballers
Expatriate footballers in Ukraine
Moldovan expatriate sportspeople in Ukraine
Expatriate footballers in Russia
Moldovan expatriate sportspeople in Russia
FC Spartak Nizhny Novgorod players
Moldovan people of Ukrainian descent